The Left Hand of God may refer to:

 The Left Hand of God (book) (full title: The Left Hand of God: Taking Back Our Country from the Religious Right), a 2006 book by Rabbi Michael Lerner
 The Left Hand of God (novel), a 2010 novel by Paul Hoffman
 The Left Hand of God, a 1951 novel by William Edmund Barrett
 The Left Hand of God, a 1955 film adaptation of the novel starring Humphrey Bogart
 The Left Hand of God: a Biography of the Holy Spirit, a 1998 book by Catholic theologian Adolf Holl
 Archangel Gabriel, referred to as "the Left Hand of God"
 Attachai Fairtex, 3 time Muay Thai World Champion

See also 
 Hand of God (disambiguation)
 Right hand of God, a metaphor for the omnipotence of God
 Finger of God (disambiguation)